RAVENHILL is an American rock band. They are originally from southern Illinois relocated to Nashville, Tennessee but now reside near the Dallas, Texas area. The band started making music in 2009. Their membership is Joshua Clifton, Brady Clifton, Kalen Orr, & Keith Schaubert with former members Coleman Fitch, Dane Johns, David Curtis, Kyle Hassenfratz, Taylor Chance, and Jonathan Raby. The band released an album, Ladies and Gentlemen, I Present To You..., independently in 2009. Their next release, the EP Live on Delmar, was released independently in 2010. They released a second extended play, Lions, in 2011, also independently. Their first studio album, Soul, was released by Slospeak Records in 2015. They released an EP called “Spirit” on Honey Gold Records in 2018. Later on August 3rd in the same year, RAVENHILL released “Midnight Gold” on Honey Gold Records.

Background
Ravenhill, which is named after Leonard Ravenhill, is a Southern rock band from southern Illinois around West Frankfort and Herrin. In 2010, the band moved to Nashville, Tennessee and signed to indie record label Slospeak Records. Their members are vocalist and guitarist Joshua Clifton, guitarists Taylor Chance and Mike Bay, bassist Brady Clifton, and drummer Kyle Hassenfratz, with their former members guitarist Dan Johns and drummers Coleman Fitch and Jonathan Raby, the latter also performing background vocals for the group.

Music history
The band commenced as a musical entity in 2009 with their first release, Ladies and Gentlemen, I Present To You..., an independently released album. They released an extended play, Live on Delmar, independently in 2010. The subsequent release, yet another extended play, Lions, was released independently on May 20, 2011. Their first studio album, Soul, was released on March 24, 2015, from Slospeak Records. The single "Mercy" hit to No. 20 on the Billboard magazine Christian rock chart.

Members

Current members
 Joshua Clifton – lead vocals, guitar
 Taylor Chance – guitar
 Mike Bay – guitar
 Brady Clifton – bass, background vocals
 Kyle Hassenfratz – drums

Former members
 Coleman Fitch – drums
 Dane Johns – guitar
 Jon Raby – drums, background vocals
 Chris Goode – drums
 Aaron Broach – keys
 David Curtis – guitar
 Jeremy Jackson – bass

Discography

Studio albums
 Ladies and Gentlemen, I Present To You... (2009, independent)
 Soul (March 24, 2015, Slospeak)

EPs
 Live on Delmar (2010, independent)
 Lions (May 20, 2011, independent)

Singles

References

External links
 Official website

Musical groups from Illinois
2009 establishments in Illinois
Musical groups established in 2009